Mathías Damián Riquero Berretta (born 29 August 1982) is a Uruguayan-born Chilean footballer that currently plays for Uruguayan club Progreso.

External links
 
 
 Tenfield Digital Profile 

1982 births
Living people
Uruguayan footballers
Uruguayan expatriate footballers
Montevideo Wanderers F.C. players
Liverpool F.C. (Montevideo) players
Villa Española players
C.A. Progreso players
C.A. Cerro players
Danubio F.C. players
Ñublense footballers
Atlético Junior footballers
Deportes Iquique footballers
Deportes Temuco footballers
Uruguayan Primera División players
Chilean Primera División players
Categoría Primera A players
Association football midfielders
Naturalized citizens of Chile
Uruguayan expatriate sportspeople in Chile
Uruguayan expatriate sportspeople in Colombia
Uruguayan expatriate sportspeople in Brazil
Expatriate footballers in Chile
Expatriate footballers in Colombia
Expatriate footballers in Brazil